In enzymology, a L-sorbose oxidase is an enzyme that catalyzes the chemical reaction

L-sorbose + O2  5-dehydro-D-fructose + H2O2

Thus, the two substrates of this enzyme are L-sorbose and O2, whereas its two products are 5-dehydro-D-fructose and H2O2.

This enzyme belongs to the family of oxidoreductases, specifically those acting on the CH-OH group of donor with oxygen as acceptor.  The systematic name of this enzyme class is L-sorbose:oxygen 5-oxidoreductase.

References

 

EC 1.1.3
Enzymes of unknown structure